Henry Horatio Gill (October 1840 – 4 March 1914) was an Australian politician.

Gill was born in New Norfolk in Tasmania in 1840. In 1887 he was elected to the Tasmanian House of Assembly, representing the seat of Kingborough. He served until 1897. He died in 1912 in Hobart.

References

1840 births
1914 deaths
Members of the Tasmanian House of Assembly